Mariana Yegros, better known by her stage name La Yegros, is an Argentinian singer-songwriter.

Private life
Mariana Yegros was born in Morón, Buenos Aires Province. Daughter of Aníbal Yegros and Pily Jara, she discovered her passion in music while being very young. Her parents are originally from Misiones Province.

Her influences come from her family origins. Her father listened to chamamé, which is traditional folk music from the north of Argentina, and her mother listened to cumbia. Later in life she explored music from India and Africa which inspired her to mix music styles.

After finishing high school, she joined the Conservatory of Music of Morón in Buenos Aires to study opera singing.

Career start

A few years after joining her studies, she joined an alternative group called De La Guarda. There were two music directors, one of whom was King Coya (Argentinean electro-cumbia producer). That opened the way for her to start performing in public, to sing in front of thousands of people.

Solo career

Her debut album Viene de Mi was released on 17 June 2013 on ZZK/Waxploitation Records. 
Gustavo Santaolalla, Gaby Kerpel, Gato Muñoz and Miss Bolivia are collaborators of this album.
It mixes electronic music with traditional Latin American rhythms like cumbia, chamamé, carnavalito and milonga. 

Singles of this album are "Viene de mí" and "Trocitos de madera".

Media platform Sounds and Colors named it "one of the best albums of 2013".

Her song "El Bendito" was featured in the football video game 2014 FIFA World Cup Brazil. 

In 2015 she released Magnetismo, through Soundway Records.
The album is a mix of influences: to chamamé melodies to cumbia and EDM. In addition, explorations into North and West African folk music – from Rai to Malian blues – hip-hop, rock, tropical pop, reggae, and dancehall are woven in.
The record has many collaborations, including Gustavo Santaolalla, Gaby Kerpel, Javier Casalla, Puerto Candelaria and Sabina Sciubba.

“Chicha Roja" is the official single of this record, which has over 6 million views on YouTube.

In 2019 she released the album Suelta, through her own records label Canta La Selva records, produced by Gaby Kerpel with the luxurious collaboration of Eduardo Cabra (also known as Visitante and part of Calle 13) and Jori Collignon (member of the tropical bass band Skip & Die). Soom T. Appears as a guest singer on "Tenemos Voz"

Singles of this album are "Alegría", "Sube La Presión" y "Linda La Cumbia" and "Tenemos Voz".

Discography

Albums

Singles

References

External links

 Artist Profile on Waxploitation Records
 La Yegros on Facebook
 Official Twitter Page

Living people
People from Morón Partido
Singers from Buenos Aires
Afro-Argentine musicians
Argentine folk singers
Argentine singer-songwriters
Year of birth missing (living people)